How Dare You may refer to:
 How Dare You! (TV series), a UK children's TV series from 1984 to 1987
 How Dare You (speech), by Greta Thunberg at the 2019 UN Climate Action Summit

Music
 How Dare You! (album), by 10cc
How Dare You? (Electric Six album), 2017
 "How Dare You!", a song by 10cc, a B-side of "I'm Mandy Fly Me"
 "How Dare You", So Cool (Sistar album)
 "How Dare You", a song by Whodini from Back in Black
 "How Dare You", a song by Lupe Fiasco from Food & Liquor II: The Great American Rap Album Pt. 1